Osintsevo is a rural locality (a selo) and the administrative center of Osintsevskoye Rural Settlement, Kishertsky District, Perm Krai, Russia. The population was 684 as of 2010. There are 10 streets.

Geography 
Osintsevo is located on the Lyok River, 29 km southeast of Ust-Kishert (the district's administrative centre) by road. Savyata is the nearest rural locality.

References 

Rural localities in Kishertsky District